The Chinese Elm cultivar Ulmus parvifolia 'Elsmo' was released by the USDA Soil Conservation Service, at Elsberry, Missouri, in 1990 as an open-pollinated, seed-propagated cultivar of extremely variable progeny.

Description
'Elsmo' has been described by one supplier as a graceful, round-headed tree often with pendulous branchlets. The leaves are dark green, changing to yellowish to reddish purple in autumn. The bark is a typical mottled combination of grey, green, orange, and brown.

Pests and diseases
The species and its cultivars are highly resistant, but not immune, to Dutch elm disease, and unaffected by the Elm Leaf Beetle Xanthogaleruca luteola.

Cultivation
The tree is not known to be cultivated beyond North America.

Accessions

North America

Chicago Botanic Garden, Glencoe, Illinois, US. 1 tree, no other details available.
Dawes Arboretum , Newark, Ohio, US. 2 trees, no acc. details available.

Nurseries

North America
Forrest Keeling , Elsberry, Missouri, US.
Lawyer Nursery, Plains, Montana, US.

References

Chinese elm cultivar
Ulmus articles missing images
Ulmus